Dana Kolidzeja (born 28 April 1999) is a Latvian swimmer. She competed in the women's 50 metre breaststroke event at the 2017 World Aquatics Championships. In 2014, she represented Latvia at the 2014 Summer Youth Olympics held in Nanjing, China.

References

External links
 

1999 births
Living people
Latvian female breaststroke swimmers
Place of birth missing (living people)
Swimmers at the 2014 Summer Youth Olympics
Swimmers at the 2015 European Games
European Games competitors for Latvia